Borut Petrič (born 28 December 1961 in Kranj, Slovenia) is a former Yugoslav freestyle swimmer, who represented Yugoslavia in three consecutive Summer Olympics, starting in 1976. A brother of swimmer Darjan Petrič, he won the silver medal in the men's 1500 m freestyle at the 1978 World Aquatics Championships in Berlin. Petrič was the youngest participant (14 years, 325 days) at the 1976 Summer Olympics in Montreal, Quebec, Canada. He also won a gold medal on 400 m freestyle in 1981. In the same year, Petrič received the Golden Badge award for best athlete of Yugoslavia. He is the coach at swimming club Fužinar Ravne.

References
 

1964 births
Living people
Yugoslav male freestyle swimmers
Slovenian male freestyle swimmers
Swimmers at the 1976 Summer Olympics
Swimmers at the 1980 Summer Olympics
Swimmers at the 1984 Summer Olympics
Olympic swimmers of Yugoslavia
Twin sportspeople
Sportspeople from Kranj
World Aquatics Championships medalists in swimming
Slovenian twins
European Aquatics Championships medalists in swimming
Mediterranean Games gold medalists for Yugoslavia
Swimmers at the 1979 Mediterranean Games
Swimmers at the 1983 Mediterranean Games
Mediterranean Games medalists in swimming